Polia is a comune (municipality) in the Province of Vibo Valentia in the Italian region of Calabria.

Polia's origins date back to 5th|8th centuries BC when Greek pioneers coming from the Gulf of Squillace, located on the east coast of Calabria facing the Ionian Sea, decided to settle on a valley today known as Jammene (from ) thus permitting to ease goods traffic between Greece and Rome through the Apennine Mountains.

Polia borders the following municipalities: Cenadi, Cortale, Filadelfia, Francavilla Angitola, Jacurso, Maierato, Monterosso Calabro and San Vito sullo Ionio.

Demographic evolution

References

External links 
 http://www.comune.polia.vv.it 
 Documento Ufficiale Beni Culturali Provincia di Vibo Valentia

Cities and towns in Calabria